Stéphane Audeguy (born 1964 Tours) is a French novelist and essayist.

He studied literature at the University of Paris, where he also taught. 
He served as an assistant professor at the University of Virginia at Charlottesville between 1986 and 1987. 
He returned to France and now lives in Paris where he teaches art history and film history at a local high school.

Awards
 Prix Maurice Genevoix from the French Academy, for La théorie des nuages
 Prix des Deux Magots, for Fils Unique

Works
 Les monstres : Si loin si proches, Gallimard, coll. Découvertes Gallimard (n° 520), 2007, 
 La théorie des nuages (The Theory of Clouds) Translator Timothy Bent 
 Fils Unique (Only Son).
 Rom@

References

External links
"Interview with Stéphane Audeguy", French book news
"Fils unique", Olivier Le Naire, TV5Monde

1964 births
Living people
Writers from Tours, France
20th-century French novelists
20th-century French male writers
21st-century French novelists
University of Paris alumni
Academic staff of the University of Paris
University of Virginia faculty
Prix des Deux Magots winners
Prix Maurice Genevoix winners
French male novelists
21st-century French male writers
Nouvelle Revue Française editors